Thomas Lamplugh (1615 – 5 May 1691) was an English churchman who became Archbishop of York.

Life
He was the son of Christopher Lamplugh of Thwing, East Riding of Yorkshire, Yorkshire and his wife Anne, daughter and coheir of Thomas Roper of Octon in the East Riding of Yorkshire whom he married on 23 November 1607 at Ruston Parva, East Riding of Yorkshire. Many sources incorrectly cite his father as Thomas, an MP for Cumberland, whose family had been seated at Dovenby in that county for a number of generations. There is an interpolation in the parish register of Lamplugh, Cumbria which has his baptism taking place on 13 June 1615.

Lamplugh was educated at St Bees School and The Queen's College, Oxford.

He was Dean of Rochester from 1673, and, from 1676, Bishop of Exeter. While in Exeter, he retained the Rochester deanery in commendam until his translation to York in 1688.

On receiving the news of the arrival of William of Orange at Brixham in Torbay, Bishop Lamplugh delivered a public address, in which he exhorted the people of his diocese to remain faithful to King James II. 
He fled to London, together with Dr. Annesley, the Dean. 
As a reward for Lamplugh's loyalty, James procured him the Archbishopric of York, which had been kept vacant for two years. 
He was confirmed in his new see before William's arrival in London, but his Jacobitism was of no very profound character and did not prevent him from assisting at William's coronation. He died at Bishopthorpe on 5 May 1691, and was buried in York Minster on 8 May 1691.

John Bowes Morrell (York Monuments p. 38) states that Lamplugh's monument in York Minster shows him "standing, appropriately grasping the pastoral staff that he finally secured by making his views agree with those in power as each change took place – he was a veritable Vicar of Bray. Drake quotes the French proverb: "To lie like an epitaph", and it might well be applied to the one on this monument, which reads: "At length, though he had solicitously declined that dignity, he was promoted to this metropolitan see ... "

Family

Lamplugh married Katherine Davenant on 25 November 1663 in Gillingham, Dorset and had five children. His surviving son was Thomas Davenant Lamplugh, D.D.

Gallery

Notes

References

 A R Jabez-Smith, "An Interpolation in a Lamplugh Parish Register", Transactions of the Cumberland & Westmorland Antiquarian & Archaeological Society, Volume LXI, 1961

External links

1615 births
1691 deaths
Archbishops of York
Archdeacons of Oxford
Archdeacons of London
Bishops of Exeter
Deans of Rochester
Doctors of Divinity
People educated at St Bees School
17th-century Anglican archbishops
People from Thwing and Octon
Principals of St Alban Hall, Oxford
17th-century Church of England bishops